Hidalgoa is a genus in the tribe Coreopsideae of the family Asteraceae.

Its species are native to tropical habitats in southern Mexico, Central America and northwestern South America.

Selected species
Named species of Hidalgoa include:
 Hidalgoa ternata - La Llave — endemic to Costa Rica.
 Hidalgoa uspanapa - B.L.Turner — Mexico.
 Hidalgoa wercklei - Hook.

Previous species classifications

Previously used botanical names for the species Hidalgoa ternata include:
 Hidalgoa breedlovei - Sherff  — Mexico.
 Hidalgoa lessingii - DC. — Mexico.
 Hidalgoa pentamera - Sherf — Mexico.
 Hidalgoa steyermarkii - Sherff
 Melampodium hidalgoa - DC. 
 Melampodium ternatum - Sherff

References

External links
Missouri Botanical Garden|eol.org: Hidalgoa overview

Coreopsideae
Asteraceae genera